Sumner High School may refer to:

 Sumner High School (Riverview, Florida)
 Sumner High School and auditorium, Sumner, Georgia
 Sumner High School (Iowa), Sumner, Iowa
 Sumner Academy of Arts & Science, Kansas City, Kansas
 Sumner High School (Louisiana), administered by the Tangipahoa Parish School Board
 Sumner High School (St. Louis), Missouri
 Sumner High School (Washington), Sumner, Washington
 Charles Sumner School, Washington, D.C.

See also
 Sumner Schools (disambiguation)